Casey Bartlett-Scott (born 11 November 1994) is an English semi-professional footballer who plays as a defender for Fareham Town.

Career

College
In 2015, Bartlett-Scott moved to the United States to play college soccer at St. Louis Community College. In two seasons with the Archers, Bartlett-Scott made 42 appearances, scoring 13 goals and tallying 18 assists. In 2017, he transferred to Columbia College, playing a further two seasons in 2017 and 2019, making 38 appearances, scoring two goals and notching three assists for the Cougars. In 2017, Bartlett-Scott was named an All-AMC Defender, and in 2019 was named First Team All-Conference and NAIA First Team All-America.

Amateur
Whilst at college, Bartlett-Scott spent time with USL PDL side Saint Louis FC U23, scoring a single goal in eight appearances. 2018 saw him compete with NPSL side Erie Commodores, who he helped win the East Conference.

Following college, Bartlett-Scott had been set to complete with Chicago FC United in the PDL, now named the USL League Two. He instead returned to England and played with 9th-tier side Fareham Town in the Wessex Football League until the season was cancelled due to the COVID-19 pandemic.

Professional
On 18 March 2021, Barlett-Scott signed a professional contract with USL Championship side Pittsburgh Riverhounds. He made his professional debut on 11 August 2021, appearing as an 83rd-minute substitute during a 3–2 loss against The Miami FC. Following the 2021 season, Bartlett-Scott's contract option was declined by Pittsburgh.

In December 2021, Bartlett-Scott rejoined Fareham Town.

References

External links
Fareham Town stats
Riverhounds profile

1994 births
Living people
Association football defenders
English expatriate footballers
English expatriate sportspeople in the United States
English footballers
Expatriate soccer players in the United States
Fareham Town F.C. players
Footballers from Portsmouth
National Premier Soccer League players
Pittsburgh Riverhounds SC players
USL Championship players
USL League Two players
Wessex Football League players